Project SuperStar (SuperStar) is the Malaysian version of Singapore's successful reality format of the same title. To date, three seasons have been completed on 8TV.

Format
Preliminary auditions are held in various cities in Malaysia in search of Chinese-singing talents. There are three sub-stages in the auditions, the first two of which involve two rungs of closed-door tests, followed by the final rung in which participants are exposed to the crowd (usually in a shopping centre) and judged in front of them, and only 24 of them — 12 male and 12 female, would qualify for the actual competition.

Upon reaching the voting rounds, the male and female finalists performed in two separate days, with the results announced in a third day for both genders. There are also three rungs of the voting rounds, the first of which is the preliminary round where contestants could choose any song available to them, while the next involved themed weeks, in each of which the each finalist must sing songs of the particular theme. In these rungs 30% of the results are determined by judges, and the rest by public votes. Third season has a huge change in the results, professional judges will have a greater say, which held 50%, and the public votes will take up the remaining 50%.

The third rung is the Grand Finale, in which the remaining one male and one female finalists battle against each other for the coveted prize of being the Malaysian SuperStar with a recording contract. Unlike the previous rungs, the judges' role in providing 30% of the results is replaced by singles sales of the final two.

Season 1

Johnson Wee emerged victor of the inaugural Project Superstar, defeating Tan Desiree in the Grand Finale held in Stadium Melawati, Shah Alam on 29 April 2006.

Season 2

On May 5, 2007, Henley Hii was crowned as champion, triumphing over Orange Tan in Stadium Melawati.

Season 3

Season 3 premiered on February 9, 2008.

Top 24

See also
Project SuperStar

References

External links
Official Site
988FM

Malaysian reality television series